Tetzaveh, Tetsaveh, T'tzaveh, or T'tzavveh (—Hebrew for "[you] shall command," the second word and first distinctive word in the parashah) is the 20th weekly Torah portion (parashah) in the annual Jewish cycle of Torah reading and the eighth in the Book of Exodus. The parashah reports God's commands to bring olive oil for the lamp (Menorah), make sacred garments for the priests, conduct an ordination ceremony, and make an incense altar.

It constitutes . The parashah is made up of 5,430 Hebrew letters, 1,412 Hebrew words, 101 verses, and 179 lines in a Torah Scroll (Sefer Torah). Jews read it the 20th Sabbath after Simchat Torah, in February or March.

Readings

First reading—Exodus 27:20–28:12
In the first reading, God instructed the Israelites to bring Moses clear olive oil, so that Aaron and his descendants as High Priest could kindle lamps regularly in the Tabernacle. God instructed Moses to make sacral vestments for Aaron: a breastpiece (Ḥoshen), the Ephod, a robe, a gold frontlet inscribed "holy to the Lord," a fringed tunic, a headdress, a sash, and linen breeches.

Second reading—Exodus 28:13–30
In the second reading, God detailed the instructions for the breastpiece. God instructed Moses to place Urim and Thummim inside the breastpiece of decision.

Third reading—Exodus 28:31–43
In the third reading, God detailed the instructions for the robe, frontlet, fringed tunic, headdress, sash, and breeches. God instructed Moses to place pomegranates and gold bells around the robe's hem, to make a sound when the High Priest entered and exited the sanctuary, so that he would not die.

Fourth reading—Exodus 29:1–18
In the fourth reading, God laid out an ordination ceremony for priests involving the sacrifice of a young bull, two rams, unleavened bread, unleavened cakes with oil mixed in, and unleavened wafers spread with oil. God instructed Moses to lead the bull to the front of the Tabernacle, let Aaron and his sons lay their hands upon the bull's head, slaughter the bull at the entrance of the Tent, and put some of the bull's blood on the horns of the altar. God instructed Moses to let Aaron and his sons lay their hands upon the first ram and slaughter it, sprinkle its blood, and dissect it.

Fifth reading—Exodus 29:19–37
In the fifth reading, God instructed Moses to take one of the rams, let Aaron and his sons lay their hands upon the ram's head, slaughter the ram, and put some of its blood and on the ridge of Aaron's right ear and on the ridges of his sons' right ears, and on the thumbs of their right hands, and on the big toes of their right feet.

Sixth reading—Exodus 29:38–46
In the sixth reading, God promised to meet and speak with Moses and the Israelites there, to abide among the Israelites, and be their God.

Seventh reading—Exodus 30:1–10
In the seventh reading, God instructed Moses to make an incense altar of acacia wood overlaid with gold—sometimes called the Golden Altar.

Readings according to the triennial cycle
Jews who read the Torah according to the triennial cycle of Torah reading read the parashah according to the following schedule:

In inner-Biblical interpretation
The parashah has parallels or is discussed in these Biblical sources:

Exodus chapters 25–39
This is the pattern of instruction and construction of the Tabernacle and its furnishings:

As the creation story unfolds in seven days, the instructions about the Tabernacle unfold in seven speeches. In both creation and Tabernacle accounts, the text notes the completion of the task. In both creation and Tabernacle, the work done is seen to be good. In both creation and Tabernacle, when the work is finished, God takes an action in acknowledgement. In both creation and Tabernacle, when the work is finished, a blessing is invoked. And in both creation and Tabernacle, God declares something "holy."

The language used to describe the building of the Tabernacle parallels that used in the story of creation. The lampstand held seven candles, Aaron wore seven sacral vestments, the account of the building of the Tabernacle alludes to the creation account, and the Tabernacle was completed on New Year's Day.  and  list seven kinds of substances—metals, yarn, skins, wood, oil, spices, and gemstones—signifying the totality of supplies.

Exodus chapter 27
 echoes and expands on the command of  about the care of the Menorah.

Exodus chapter 28

Exodus chapter 29
The Torah mentions the combination of ear, thumb, and toe in three places. In , God instructed Moses how to initiate the priests, telling him to kill a ram, take some of its blood, and put it on the tip of the right ear of Aaron and his sons, on the thumb of their right hand, and on the great toe of their right foot, and dash the remaining blood against the altar round about. And then  reports that Moses followed God's instructions to initiate Aaron and his sons. Then, 17, 25, and 28 set forth a similar procedure for the cleansing of a person with skin disease (tzara'at). In , God instructed the priest on the day of the person's cleansing to take some of the blood of a guilt-offering and put it upon the tip of the right ear, the thumb of the right hand, and the great toe of the right foot of the one to be cleansed.

Exodus chapter 30

In early nonrabbinic interpretation

The parashah is discussed in these early nonrabbinic sources:

Exodus chapter 28
Like the morning star among the clouds, like the full moon at the festal season; like the sun shining on the Temple of the Most High, like the rainbow gleaming in splendid clouds.”

Josephus interpreted the Ephod of the four colors gold, blue, purple, and scarlet to signify that God made the universe of four elements, with the gold interwoven to show the splendor by which all things are enlightened. He interpreted the golden bells and pomegranates that  says hung on the fringes of the High Priest's garments to signify thunder and lightning, respectively.

Josephus reported that the Urim and Thumin stopped shining 200 years before his day, as God had become displeased with the transgressions of God’s law.

Exodus chapter 29
For the ear symbolized the hearing with which people judge one's words, the hand symbolized action, and the foot symbolized the way in which a person walks in life. And since each of these is an extremity of the right side of the body, Philo imagined that  teaches that one should labor to attain improvement in everything with dexterity and felicity, as an archer aims at a target.

In classical rabbinic interpretation
The parashah is discussed in these rabbinic sources from the era of the Mishnah and the Talmud:

Exodus chapter 27
A Midrash taught that God considers studying the sanctuary’s structure as equivalent to rebuilding it.

The Mishnah posited that one could have inferred that meal-offerings would require the purest olive oil, for if the Menorah, whose oil was not eaten, required pure olive oil, how much more so should meal-offerings, whose oil was eaten. But  states, "pure olive oil beaten for the light," but not "pure olive oil beaten for meal-offerings," to make clear that such purity was required only for the Menorah and not for meal-offerings. The Mishnah taught that there were three harvests of olives, and each crop gave three kinds of oil (for a total of nine types of oil). The first crop of olives was picked from the top of the tree; they were pounded and put into a basket (Rabbi Judah said around the inside of the basket) to yield the first oil. The olives were then pressed beneath a beam (Rabbi Judah said with stones) to yield the second oil. The olives were then ground and pressed again to yield the third oil. Only the first oil was fit for the Menorah, while the second and third were for meal-offerings. The second crop is when the olives at roof-level were picked from the tree; they were pounded and put into the basket (Rabbi Judah said around the inside of the basket) to yield the first oil (of the second crop). The olives were then pressed with the beam (Rabbi Judah said with stones) to yield the second oil (of the second crop). The olives were then ground and pressed again to yield the third oil. Once again, with the second crop, only the first oil was fit for the Menorah, while the second and third were for meal-offerings. The third crop was when the last olives of the tree were packed in a vat until they became overripe. These olives were then taken up and dried on the roof and then pounded and put into the basket (Rabbi Judah said around the inside of the basket) to yield the first oil. The olives were next pressed with the beam (Rabbi Judah said with stones) to yield the second oil. And then they were ground and pressed again to yield the third oil. Once again, with the third crop, only the first oil was fit for the Menorah, while the second and third were for meal-offerings.

The Mishnah taught that there was a stone in front of the Menorah with three steps on which the priest stood to trim the lights. The priest left the oil jar on the second step.

A Midrash taught that the lights of the Tabernacle Menorah were replicas of the heavenly lights. The Midrash taught that everything God created in heaven has a replica on earth. Thus  reports, "And the light dwells with [God]" in heaven. While below on earth,  directs, "That they bring to you pure olive-oil beaten for the light." (Thus, since all that is above is also below, God dwells on earth just as God dwells in heaven.) What is more, the Midrash taught that God holds the things below dearer than those above, for God left the things in heaven to descend to dwell among those below, as  reports, "And let them make Me a sanctuary, that I may dwell among them."

Citing , the Gemara taught that seeing olive oil in a dream portends seeing the light of Torah.

The Midrash taught that just as the olive is beaten, ground, tied up with ropes, and then at last it yields its oil, so the nations beat, imprisoned, bound, and surrounded Israel, and when at last Israel repents of its sins, God answers it.

A Midrash taught that God instructed Moses to cause a lamp to burn in the Tabernacle not because God needed the light, but so that the Israelites might be able to give light to God as God gave light to the Israelites. The Midrash likened this to the case of a man who could see, walking along with a blind man. The seeing man offered to guide the blind man. When they came home, the seeing man asked the blind man to kindle a lamp for him and illumine his path, so that the blind man would no longer be obliged to the seeing man for having accompanied the blind man on the way. The seeing man of the story is God, for 2 Chronicles  and  say, "For the eyes of the Lord run to and fro throughout the whole earth." And the blind man is Israel, as  says, "We grope for the wall like the blind, yea, as they that have no eyes do we grope; we stumble at noon-day as in the twilight" (and the Israelites stumbled in the matter of the Golden Calf at midday). God illumined the way for the Israelites (after they stumbled with the Calf) and led them, as  says, "And the Lord went before them by day."

Another Midrash taught that the words of the Torah give light to those who study them, but those who do not occupy themselves with the Torah stumble. The Midrash compared this to those who stand in the dark; as soon as they start walking, they stumble, fall, and knock their face on the ground—all because they have no lamp in their hand. It is the same with those who have no Torah; they strike against sin, stumble, and die. The Midrash further taught that those who study the Torah give forth light wherever they may be. The lamp of God is the Torah, as  says, "For the commandment is a lamp, and the teaching is light." The commandment is "a lamp" because those who perform a commandment kindle a light before God and revive their souls, as  says, "The spirit of man is the lamp of the Lord."

A Baraita taught that they used the High Priest's worn-out trousers to make the wicks of the Temple Menorah and the worn-out trousers of ordinary priests for candelabra outside the Temple. And thus the Rabbis concluded that no material other than flax—as in the fine linen of the High Priest's clothing—would allow the flame to ascend by itself. Similarly, Rami bar Hama deduced from the use of word , lehaalot, in  that the Menorah flame had to ascend by itself, and not through other means (such as adjustment by the priests). Thus Rami bar Hama taught that the wicks and oil that the Sages taught one could not light on the Sabbath, one could also not light in the Temple. The Gemara challenged Rami bar Hama, however, citing a Mishnah that taught that the worn-out breeches and girdles of priests were torn and used to kindle the lights for the celebration of the Water-Drawing. The Gemara posited that perhaps that celebration was different. The Gemara countered with the teaching of Rabbah bar Masnah, who taught that worn-out priestly garments were torn and made into wicks for the Temple. And the Gemara clarified that the linen garments were meant.

A Baraita taught that , “Aaron and his sons shall set it in order, to burn from evening to morning,” means that God instructed them to provide the Menorah with the requisite amount of oil so that it could burn from evening to morning. And the Sages calculated that a half-log of oil (roughly 5 ounces) would burn from evening to morning. The Gemara reported that some said that they calculated this by reducing the original quantity of oil, first filling each lamp with a large quantity of oil and on finding in the morning that there was still oil in the lamp, gradually reducing the quantity until they arrived at a half-log. Others said that they calculated it by increasing it, first filling the lamp with a small quantity of oil and the next evening increasing the quantity of oil until they arrived at the standard of the half-log. Those who said that they calculated it by increasing the quantity of oil said that the Torah has consideration for the Israelites' resources and to calculate by using the larger quantity of oil in the first instance wasted the oil that was still in the lamp in the morning. And those who said that they calculated it by reducing it said that there was no stinting in the place of wealth, the Sanctuary.

The Baraita reported that another interpretation held that  taught that no other service was valid from evening to morning apart from kindling the Menorah. For  says: “Aaron and his sons shall set it in order, to burn from evening to morning,” and this implies that “it”—and no other thing—shall be from evening to morning. Thus, the Gemara concluded that nothing may come after the kindling of the lights, and consequently the slaughtering of the Passover offering must happen before. And the Gemara likened the burning of incense to the kindling of the Menorah, holding that just as no service could follow lighting the Menorah, so no service could follow burning the incense. And because the Gemara likened the burning of incense to the kindling of the Menorah, it also concluded that just as at the time of the Menorah lighting there was a burning of incense, similarly, at the time of the cleaning of the Menorah there was also a burning of incense.

Exodus chapter 28
In , God chose Aaron and his sons to minister to God in the priest's office. Hillel taught that Aaron loved peace and pursued peace, and loved his fellow creatures and brought them closer to the Torah.

Aaron really intended to delay the people until Moses came down, but Moses thought that Aaron was participating in the sin and was incensed with him. So God told Moses that God knew that Aaron's intentions were good. The Midrash compared it to a prince who became mentally unstable and started digging to undermine his father's house. His tutor told him not to weary himself but to let him dig. When the king saw it, he said that he knew the tutor's intentions were good, and declared that the tutor would rule over the palace. So God told Aaron that God knew Aaron's intention, and that only Aaron would have sovereignty over the sacrifices that the Israelites would bring. Rabbi Levi compared it to the friend of a king who was a member of the imperial cabinet and a judge. When the king was about to appoint a palace governor, he told his friend that he intended to appoint the friend's brother.

The High Priest adds to those the breastplate, the apron, the robe, and the frontlet. And the High Priest wore these eight garments when he inquired of the Urim and Thummim.

Rabbi Joḥanan called his garments "my honor." Rabbi Aha bar Abba said in Rabbi Joḥanan's name that , "And he shall put off his garments, and put on other garments," teaches that a change of garments is an act of honor in the Torah. And the School of Rabbi Ishmael taught that the Torah teaches us manners: In the garments in which one cooked a dish for one's master, one should not pour a cup of wine for one's master. Rabbi Hiyya bar Abba said in Rabbi Joḥanan's name that it is a disgrace for a scholar to go out into the marketplace with patched shoes. The Gemara objected that Rabbi Aha bar Hanina went out that way; Rabbi Aha son of Rav Nachman clarified that the prohibition is of patches upon patches. Thus a scholar who has no pride in personal appearance brings contempt upon learning. Ravina taught that this was stated about a thick patch (or others say, a bloodstain). The Gemara harmonized the two opinions by teaching that one referred to an outer garment, the other to an undergarment.

The Babylonian Talmud related a story of how the description of the High Priest's garments in  led a non-Jew to convert to Judaism. The non-Jew asked Shammai to convert him to Judaism on condition that Shammai appoint him High Priest. Shammai pushed him away with a builder's ruler. The non-Jew then went to Hillel, who converted him. Hillel answered that it applied even to David, King of Israel, who had not been a priest. Thereupon the convert reasoned a fortiori that if the injunction applied to all (non-priestly) Israelites, whom in  God had called "my firstborn," how much more so would the injunction apply to a mere convert, who came among the Israelites with just his staff and bag. Then the convert returned to Shammai, quoted the injunction, and remarked on how absurd it had been for him to ask Shammai to appoint him High Priest. And he came before Hillel and blessed him for bringing him under the wings of the Divine Presence.

Similarly, citing Mishnah Yoma 7:5, Rabbi Simon taught that even as the sacrifices had an atoning power, so too did the priestly garments. Rabbi Simon explained that the priests' tunic atoned for those who wore a mixture of wool and linen (shaatnez, prohibited by ), as  says, "And he made him a coat (tunic) of many colors" (and the Jerusalem Talmud explained that Joseph's coat was similar to one made of the forbidden mixture). The breeches atoned for unchastity, as  says, "And you shall make them linen breeches to cover the flesh of their nakedness." The miter atoned for arrogance, as  says, "And you shall set the miter on his head." Some said that the girdle atoned for the crooked in heart, and others said for thieves. Rabbi Levi said that the girdle was 32 cubits long (about 48 feet), and that the priest wound it towards the front and towards the back, and this was the ground for saying that it was to atone for the crooked in heart (as the numerical value of the Hebrew word for heart is 32). The one who said that the girdle atoned for thieves argued that since the girdle was hollow, it resembled thieves, who do their work in secret, hiding their stolen goods in hollows and caves. The breastplate atoned for those who pervert justice, as  says, "And you shall put in the breastplate of judgment." The Ephod atoned for idol-worshippers, as  says, "and without Ephod or teraphim." Rabbi Simon taught in the name of Rabbi Nathan that the robe atoned for two sins, unintentional manslaughter (for which the Torah provided cities of refuge) and evil speech.

The robe atoned for evil speech by the bells on its fringe, as  says, "A golden bell and a pomegranate, a golden bell and a pomegranate, upon the skirts of the robe round about. And it shall be upon Aaron to minister, and the sound thereof shall be heard."  thus implies that this sound made atonement for the sound of evil speech. There is not strictly atonement for one who unintentionally slays a human being, but the Torah provides a means of atonement by the death of the High Priest, as  says, "after the death of the High Priest the manslayer may return to the land of his possession." Some said that the forehead-plate atoned for the shameless, while others said for blasphemers.

They made its hems of turquoise, purple, and crimson wool, twisted together and formed into the shape of pomegranates whose mouths were not yet opened (as overripe pomegranates open slightly) and in the shape of the cones of the helmets on children's heads. Seventy-two bells containing 72 clappers were hung on the robe, 36 on each side (front and behind). Rabbi Dosa (or others say, Judah the Prince) said in the name of Rabbi Judah that there were 36 bells in all, 18 on each side.

Rabbi Eleazar deduced from the words "that the breastplate not be loosed from the Ephod" in  that one who removed the breastplate from the apron received the punishment of lashes. Rav Aha bar Jacob objected that perhaps  meant merely to instruct the Israelites to fasten the breast-plate securely so that it would "not be loosed." But the Gemara noted that  does not say merely, "so that it not be loosed."

The Mishnah taught that the High Priest inquired of the Urim and Thummim noted in  only for the king, for the court, or for one whom the community needed.

The term "Thummim" is like the Hebrew word tam meaning "to be complete," and thus it was called "Thummim" because its predictions were fulfilled. The Gemara discussed how they used the Urim and Thummim: Rabbi Joḥanan said that the letters of the stones in the breastplate stood out to spell out the answer. Resh Lakish said that the letters joined each other to spell words. But the Gemara noted that the Hebrew letter , tsade, was missing from the list of the 12 tribes of Israel. Rabbi Samuel bar Isaac said that the stones of the breastplate also contained the names of Abraham, Isaac and Jacob. But the Gemara noted that the Hebrew letter , teth, was also missing. Rav Aha bar Jacob said that they also contained the words: "The tribes of Jeshurun." The Gemara taught that although the decree of a prophet could be revoked, the decree of the Urim and Thummim could not be revoked, as  says, "By the judgment of the Urim."

For every tribe that had sinned, the light of its stone became dim, and Joshua saw that the light of the stone for the tribe of Judah had become dim. So Joshua knew that the tribe of Judah had transgressed in the matter of the devoted things. Similarly, the Pirke De-Rabbi Eliezer taught that Saul saw the Philistines turning against Israel, and he knew that Israel had sinned in the matter of the ban. Saul looked at the 12 stones, and for each tribe that had followed the law, its stone (on the High Priest's breastplate) shined with its light, and for each tribe that had transgressed, the light of its stone was dim. So Saul knew that the tribe of Benjamin had trespassed in the matter of the ban.

The Mishnah reported that with the death of the former prophets, the Urim and Thummim ceased. In this connection, the Gemara reported differing views of who the former prophets were. Rav Huna said they were David, Samuel, and Solomon. Rav Nachman said that during the days of David, they were sometimes successful and sometimes not (getting an answer from the Urim and Thummim), for Zadok consulted it and succeeded, while Abiathar consulted it and was not successful, as  reports, "And Abiathar went up." (He retired from the priesthood because the Urim and Thummim gave him no reply.) But the Gemara answered that Uzziah did so through Zechariah's prophecy. A Baraita told that when the first Temple was destroyed, the Urim and Thummim ceased, and explained  (reporting events after the Jews returned from the Babylonian Captivity), "And the governor said to them that they should not eat of the most holy things till there stood up a priest with Urim and Thummim," as a reference to the remote future, as when one speaks of the time of the Messiah. Rav Nachman concluded that the term "former prophets" referred to a period before Haggai, Zechariah, and Malachi, who were latter prophets. And the Jerusalem Talmud taught that the "former prophets" referred to Samuel and David, and thus the Urim and Thummim did not function in the period of the First Temple, either.

But Abaye interpreted a saying of Resh Lakish and a Baraita to teach that the sleeves of the priestly garments were woven separately and then attached to the garment using needlework, and the sleeves reached down to the priest's wrist.

Rehava said in the name of Rav Judah that one who tore a priestly garment was liable to punishment with lashes, for  says "that it be not rent." Rav Aha bar Jacob objected that perhaps  meant to instruct that the Israelites make a hem so that the garment would not tear. But the Gemara noted that  does not say merely, "lest it be torn."

The Baraita taught that two lines were written on it, with the four-letter name of God  on the top line and "holy to" (kodesh la) on the bottom line. But Rabbi Eliezer son of Rabbi Jose said that he saw it in Rome (where it was taken after the destruction of the Temple) and "holy to the Lord" was written in one line.

Rabbi Eleazar the son of Rabbi Simeon taught that there was not even any distinction in the belt. Ravin reported that all agree that on Yom Kippur, the High Priest's belt was made of fine linen (as stated in ), and during the rest of the year a belt made of both wool and linen (shatnez) (as stated in ). The difference concerned only the common priest's belt, both on the Day of Atonement and during the rest of the year. Concerning that, Rabbi said it was made of both wool and linen, and Rabbi Eleazar the son of Rabbi Simeon said it was made of fine linen.

They had laces but had no padding in either back or front (and thus fit loosely).

Exodus chapter 29

A Baraita taught that a priest who performed sacrifices without the proper priestly garments was liable to death at the hands of Heaven. Thus, the Gemara reasoned, when wearing their proper priestly garments, priests were invested with their priesthood; but when they were not wearing their proper priestly garments, they lacked their priesthood and were considered like non-priests, who were liable to death if they performed the priestly service.

The Midrash continued that the earlier 70 elders were consumed like Nadab and Abihu, because they too acted frivolously when (as reported in ) they beheld God and inappropriately ate and drank. The Midrash taught that Nadab, Abihu, and the 70 elders deserved to die then, but because God so loved giving the Torah, God did not wish to create disturb that time.

The Mishnah explained how the priests carried out the rites of the wave-offering described in  On the east side of the altar, the priest placed the two loaves on the two lambs and put his two hands beneath them and waved them forward and backward and upward and downward.

As  thus compares "heaving" to "waving," the Midrash deduced that in every case where the priest waved, he also heaved.

Phinehas the son of Eleazar the priest, to the war, with the holy vessels." But the Midrash concluded that  refers to the Ark of the Covenant, to which  refers when it says, "the service of the holy things."

Seven days shall the son that is priest in his stead put them on." This text demonstrated that a priest who had put on the required larger number of garments and who had been anointed on each of the seven days was permitted to serve as High Priest. , however, says, "And the priest who shall be anointed and who shall be consecrated to be priest in his father's stead shall make the atonement." The Baraita interpreted the words, "Who shall be anointed and who shall be consecrated," to mean one who had been anointed and consecrated in whatever way (as long as he had been consecrated, even if some detail of the ceremony had been omitted). The Baraita thus concluded that if the priest had put on the larger number of garments for only one day and had been anointed on each of the seven days, or if he had been anointed for only one day and had put on the larger number of garments for seven days, he would also be permitted to perform the Yom Kippur service. Noting that  indicated that the larger number of garments was necessary in the first instance for the seven days, the Gemara asked what Scriptural text supported the proposition that anointment on each of the seven days was in the first instance required. The Gemara answered that one could infer that from the fact that a special statement of the Torah was necessary to exclude it. As  puts the anointing and the donning of the larger number of garments on the same level, therefore, just as the donning of the larger number of garments was required for seven days, so was the anointing obligatory for seven days.

And as  reports, "when all the people saw, they shouted, and fell on their faces."

The Gemara interpreted the report in  that the Tabernacle "shall be sanctified by My glory" to refer to the death of Nadab and Abihu. The Gemara taught that one should read not "My glory" (bi-khevodi) but "My honored ones" (bi-khevuday). When Aaron's sons died, Moses told Aaron in  that Aaron's sons died only that God's glory might be sanctified through them. When Aaron thus perceived that his sons were God's honored ones, Aaron was silent, as  reports, "And Aaron held his peace," and Aaron was rewarded for his silence.

Exodus chapter 30

Rabbi Jose argued that the dimensions of the inner altar in  helped to interpret the size of the outer altar. Rabbi Judah maintained that the outer altar was wider than Rabbi Jose thought it was, whereas Rabbi Jose maintained that the outer altar was taller than Rabbi Judah thought it was. But Rabbi Judah noted that  uses the word "square" (ravua), just as  uses the word "square" (ravua). The Gemara explained that we know that this is how to understand  because  says, "And the hearth shall be 12 cubits long by 12 cubits broad, square," and  continues, "to the four sides thereof," teaching that the measurement was taken from the middle (interpreting "to" as intimating that from a particular point, there were 12 cubits in all directions, hence from the center). Rabbi Jose, however, reasoned that a common use of the word "square" applied to the height of the altar. But Rabbi Jose noted that  uses the word "square" (ravua), just as  uses the word "square" (ravua, referring to the inner altar). Rabbi Judah questioned Rabbi Jose's conclusion, for if priests stood on the altar to perform the service 10 cubits above the ground, the people would see them from outside the courtyard. Rabbi Jose replied to Rabbi Judah that  states, "And the hangings of the court, and the screen for the door of the gate of the court, which is by the Tabernacle and by the altar round about," teaching that just as the Tabernacle was 10 cubits high, so was the altar 10 cubits high; and  says, "The hangings for the one side were fifteen cubits" (teaching that the walls of the courtyard were 15 cubits high). Rabbi Judah, however, granted that the priest could be seen outside the Tabernacle, but argued that the sacrifice in his hands could not be seen.

In medieval Jewish interpretation
The parashah is discussed in these medieval Jewish sources:

Exodus chapter 28

Interpreting , "And you shall make holy garments for Aaron your brother, for splendor and for beauty," Nachmanides taught that the High Priest's garments corresponded to the garments that monarchs wore when the Torah was given. Nachmanides taught that the ephod and the breastplate were also royal garments, and the plate that the High Priest wore around the forehead was like a monarch's crown. Finally, Nachmanides noted that the High Priest's garments were made of (in the words of ) "gold," "blue-purple," and "red-purple," which were all symbolic of royalty.

Maimonides noted that in nature, God created animals that develop gradually. For example, when a mammal is born, it is extremely tender, and cannot eat dry food, so God provided breasts that yield milk to feed the young animal, until it can eat dry food. Similarly, Maimonides taught, God instituted many laws as temporary measures, as it would have been impossible for the Israelites suddenly to discontinue everything to which they had become accustomed. So God sent Moses to make the Israelites (in the words of ) "a kingdom of priests and a holy nation." But the general custom of worship in those days was sacrificing animals in temples that contained idols. So God did not command the Israelites to give up those manners of service, but allowed them to continue. God transferred to God's service what had formerly served as a worship of idols, and commanded the Israelites to serve God in the same manner—namely, to build to a Sanctuary, to erect the altar to God's name, to offer sacrifices to God, to bow down to God, and to burn incense before God. God forbade doing any of these things to any other being and selected priests for the service in the temple in  "And they shall minister to me in the priest's office." By this Divine plan, God blotted out the traces of idolatry, and established the great principle of the Existence and Unity of God. But the sacrificial service, Maimonides taught, was not the primary object of God's commandments about sacrifice; rather, supplications, prayers, and similar kinds of worship are nearer to the primary object. Thus God limited sacrifice to only one temple (see ) and the priesthood to only the members of a particular family. These restrictions, Maimonides taught, served to limit sacrificial worship, and kept it within such bounds that God did not feel it necessary to abolish sacrificial service altogether. But in the Divine plan, prayer and supplication can be offered everywhere and by every person, as can be the wearing of tzitzit and tefillin (16) and similar kinds of service.

In modern interpretation
The parashah is discussed in these modern sources:

Exodus chapter 27
Originally Jews set the ner tamid opposite the ark on the synagogue's western wall, but then moved it to a niche by the side of the ark and later to a lamp suspended above the ark. Plaut reported that the ner tamid has come to symbolize God's presence, a spiritual light emanating as if from the Temple.

Exodus chapter 28
Noting that  first introduces Aaron and his family as “priests” without further defining the term, Plaut concluded that either the institution was already well known at the time (as the Egyptians and Midianites had priests) or that the story was retrojected back from a later time that had long known priests and their job. Scholars found the priestly garments unrealistic, complex, and extravagant, hardly befitting a wilderness setting. Plaut concluded, however, that while the text likely contains embellishments from later times, there is little reason to doubt that it also reports traditions going back to Israel's earliest days.

Reading in  the instruction to make holy garments for Aaron and his sons “for glory and for beauty,” Umberto Cassuto explained that these were clothes that would indicate the degree of holiness in keeping with his high office. Nahum Sarna wrote that God ordained special attire for Aaron and his sons as insignia of office, so that the occupants of the sacred office could be distinguishable from the laity just as sacred space could be differentiated from profane space.

Sarna noted that  makes no mention of footwear, as the priests officiated barefoot.

In the synagogue, the Torah scroll is similarly embellished and dressed in an embroidered mantle and crowned by pomegranates and bells.

Brueggemann concluded that the affirmation and devastating critique of Aaron live close together in the text, teaching that the affirmation, the temptation, and the critique are inherent in the priesthood and the handler of holy things.

Fox argued that the tzitzit on the Israelites' garments identified them as being holy to God and symbolically connected them to the priests. Thereby, the Israelites pledged their loyalty to God as well as to the priests who oversaw the laws.

Anointing oil symbolized wellbeing, and its daily use (especially in later Rome) was emblematic of the good life. The pouring of oil on the head signified having been favored by or set apart for the deity. Israelites chiefly used olive oil for ointments, Babylonians also used sesame oil and animal fats, and Egyptians used almond oil and animal fats.

Exodus chapter 29
Everett Fox noted that “glory” (kevod) and “stubbornness” (kaved lev) are leading words throughout the book of Exodus that give it a sense of unity.

Commandments
According to Maimonides and Sefer ha-Chinuch, there are 4 positive and 3 negative commandments in the parashah:
To light the Menorah every day
The Kohanim must wear their priestly garments during service.
The breastpiece must not be loosened from the Ephod.
Not to tear the priestly garments
The Kohanim must eat the sacrificial meat.
To burn incense every day
Not to burn anything on the incense altar besides incense

In the liturgy
The tamid sacrifice that  called for the priests to offer at twilight presaged the afternoon prayer service, called "Mincha" or "offering" in Hebrew.

Haftarah

Generally

Connection to the Parashah
Both the parashah and the haftarah in Ezekiel describe God's holy sacrificial altar and its consecration, the parashah in the Tabernacle in the wilderness, and the haftarah in Ezekiel's conception of a future Temple. Both the parashah and the haftarah describe plans conveyed by a mighty prophet, Moses in the parashah and Ezekiel in the haftarah.

On Shabbat Zachor
When Parashat Tetzaveh coincides with Shabbat Zachor (the special Sabbath immediately preceding Purim), as it does in 2023, 2025, 2026, 2028, 2029, 2031, 2032, 2034, 2036, 2037, 2039, 2040, 2042, 2044, 2045, 2047, and 2050, the haftarah is:
for Ashkenazi Jews: ;
for Sephardi Jews: .

Connection to the Special Sabbath
On Shabbat Zachor, the Sabbath just before Purim, Jews read , which instructs Jews: "Remember (zachor) what Amalek did" in attacking the Israelites. The haftarah for Shabbat Zachor,  or 1–34, describes Saul's encounter with Amalek and Saul's and Samuel's treatment of the Amalekite king Agag. Purim, in turn, commemorates the story of Esther (said to be a descendant of Saul in some rabbinic literature) and the Jewish people's victory over Haman's plan to kill the Jews, told in the book of Esther.  identifies Haman as an Agagite, and thus a descendant of Amalek.  identifies the Agagites with the Amalekites. Alternatively, a Midrash tells the story that between King Agag's capture by Saul and his killing by Samuel, Agag fathered a child, from whom Haman in like turn descended.

Notes

Further reading
The parashah has parallels or is discussed in these sources:

Biblical
 (making the priests' vestments).
 (priest wearing linen);  (high priest wearing linen).
 (combining wool and linen).
 (priest wearing linen);  (priests wearing linen).
 (David wearing linen in worship).
 (holy man clad in linen);  (priests wearing linen).
 (holy man clad in linen);  (holy man clad in linen).
Psalms  (holiness of God);  (Moses and Aaron);  (holiness of God);  (Moses and Aaron);  (Moses and Aaron);  (house of Aaron);  (house of Aaron);  (anointing Aaron).

 (David and Levites wearing linen in worship).
 (Levites wearing linen in worship).

Early nonrabbinic
Philo. Allegorical Interpretation book 1 26:81; book 3 40:118; On the Migration of Abraham 18:103; On the Life of Moses 2:29:150–51; The Special Laws 1:51:276. Alexandria, Egypt, early 1st Century CE. In, e.g., The Works of Philo: Complete and Unabridged, New Updated Edition. Translated by Charles Duke Yonge, 34, 63, 263, 504, 560. Peabody, Massachusetts: Hendrickson Publishers, 1993.
Josephus. The Wars of the Jews, 5:5:7. Circa 75 CE. In, e.g., The Works of Josephus: Complete and Unabridged, New Updated Edition. Translated by William Whiston, 708. Peabody, Massachusetts: Hendrickson Publishers, 1987.
Josephus, Antiquities of the Jews 3:6:1–3:10:1. Circa 93–94. In, e.g., The Works of Josephus: Complete and Unabridged, New Updated Edition. Translated by William Whiston, 85–95. Peabody, Massachusetts: Hendrickson Publishers, 1987.

Classical rabbinic
Mishnah: Yoma 7:5; Sukkah 5:3; Sotah 9:12; Zevachim 4:3; Menachot 5:6, 8:4–5; Keritot 1:1; Tamid 3:9, 7:1; Kinnim 3:6. Land of Israel, circa 200 CE. In, e.g., The Mishnah: A New Translation. Translated by Jacob Neusner, pages 277, 289, 464, 705, 743, 749–50, 867, 871, 889. New Haven: Yale University Press, 1988.
Tosefta: Sotah 7:17; Menachot 6:11, 7:6, 9:16. Land of Israel, circa 250 CE. In, e.g., The Tosefta: Translated from the Hebrew, with a New Introduction. Translated by Jacob Neusner, volume 1, page 865; volume 2, pages 1430–31, 1435, 1448. Peabody, Massachusetts: Hendrickson Publishers, 2002.
Jerusalem Talmud: Challah 20a; Shabbat 20b; Pesachim 35a, 57a, 62a; Shekalim 38b; Yoma 3a, 5a, 6b, 8b, 14a–15a, 16a, 20a–b, 21b, 36a–b, 49b–50a; Sukkah 29b; Megillah 17a; Chagigah 1b, 14b, 28a; Sotah 24b, 34b; Shevuot 6b; Horayot 14b. Tiberias, Land of Israel, circa 400 CE. In, e.g., Talmud Yerushalmi. Edited by Chaim Malinowitz, Yisroel Simcha Schorr, and Mordechai Marcus, volumes 11, 13, 18–22, 26–27, 37, 46, 49. Brooklyn: Mesorah Publications, 2008–2020.
Midrash Tanḥuma Tetzaveh. 5th–10th centuries. In, e.g., The Metsudah Midrash Tanchuma: Shemos II. Translated and annotated by Avrohom Davis; edited by Yaakov Y.H. Pupko, volume 4 (Shemos volume 2), pages 145–205. Monsey, New York: Eastern Book Press, 2004.

Babylonian Talmud: Berakhot 26b, 57a; Shabbat 12a, 21a, 31a, 63b, 113b–14a; Eruvin 4a; Pesachim 16b, 24a, 59a–b, 72b, 77a, 92a; Yoma 5a–b, 7a–b, 14a–b, 15a, 31b, 33a–b, 45b, 52b, 57b, 58b, 61a, 68b, 71b–72b; Sukkah 5a, 37b, 49b; Taanit 11b; Megillah 12a–b, 29b; Chagigah 26b; Yevamot 40a, 60b, 68b, 87a, 90a; Nedarim 10b; Nazir 47b; Sotah 9b, 36a, 38a, 48a–b; Gittin 20a–b; Bava Batra 8b, 106b; Sanhedrin 12b, 34b, 61b, 83a–b, 106a; Makkot 13a, 17a, 18a–b; Shevuot 8b, 9b–10b, 14a; Avodah Zarah 10b, 23b, 39a; Zevachim 12b, 17b, 19a, 22b–23a, 24b, 26a, 28b, 44b, 45b, 59b, 83b, 87a, 88a–b, 95a, 97b, 112b, 115b, 119b; Menachot 6a, 11a, 12b, 14b, 25a, 29a, 36b, 42b, 49a, 50a–51a, 61a, 73a, 83a, 86a–b, 89a, 98b; Chullin 7a, 138a; Arakhin 3b–4a, 16a; Keritot 5a; Meilah 11b, 17b; Niddah 13b. Sasanian Empire, 6th Century. In, e.g., Talmud Bavli. Edited by Yisroel Simcha Schorr, Chaim Malinowitz, and Mordechai Marcus, 72 volumes. Brooklyn: Mesorah Publications, 2006.

Medieval
Bede. Of the Tabernacle and Its Vessels, and of the Priestly Vestments. Monkwearmouth, England, 720s. In Bede: On the Tabernacle. Translated with notes and introduction by Arthur G. Holder. Liverpool: Liverpool University Press, 1994.
Exodus Rabbah 36:1–38:9. 10th Century. In, e.g., Midrash Rabbah: Exodus. Translated by Simon M. Lehrman, volume 3, pages 436–57. London: Soncino Press, 1939.

Saadia Gaon. The Book of Beliefs and Opinions, 2:11; 3:10. Baghdad, Babylonia, 933. Translated by Samuel Rosenblatt, 125, 177. New Haven: Yale Univ. Press, 1948.
Rashi. Commentary. Exodus 27–30. Troyes, France, late 11th Century. In, e.g., Rashi. The Torah: With Rashi's Commentary Translated, Annotated, and Elucidated. Translated and annotated by Yisrael Isser Zvi Herczeg, 2:375–421. Brooklyn: Mesorah Publications, 1994.
Rashbam. Commentary on the Torah. Troyes, early 12th century. In, e.g., Rashbam's Commentary on Exodus: An Annotated Translation. Edited and translated by Martin I. Lockshin, pages 351–84. Atlanta: Scholars Press, 1997.
Abraham ibn Ezra. Commentary on the Torah. France, 1153. In, e.g., Ibn Ezra's Commentary on the Pentateuch: Exodus (Shemot). Translated and annotated by H. Norman Strickman and Arthur M. Silver, volume 2, pages 583–628. New York: Menorah Publishing Company, 1996.

Maimonides. Guide for the Perplexed, part 1, chapter 25; part 3, chapters 4, 32, 45, 46, 47. Cairo, Egypt, 1190. In, e.g., Moses Maimonides. The Guide for the Perplexed. Translated by Michael Friedländer, pages 34, 257, 323, 357, 362, 369. New York: Dover Publications, 1956.
Hezekiah ben Manoah. Hizkuni. France, circa 1240. In, e.g., Chizkiyahu ben Manoach. Chizkuni: Torah Commentary. Translated and annotated by Eliyahu Munk, volume 2, pages 595–610. Jerusalem: Ktav Publishers, 2013.
Nachmanides. Commentary on the Torah. Jerusalem, circa 1270. In, e.g., Ramban (Nachmanides): Commentary on the Torah. Translated by Charles B. Chavel, volume 2, pages 471–509. New York: Shilo Publishing House, 1973.

Zohar 2:179b–187b. Spain, late 13th Century. In, e.g., The Zohar. Translated by Harry Sperling and Maurice Simon. 5 volumes. London: Soncino Press, 1934.
Bahya ben Asher. Commentary on the Torah. Spain, early 14th century. In, e.g., Midrash Rabbeinu Bachya: Torah Commentary by Rabbi Bachya ben Asher. Translated and annotated by Eliyahu Munk, volume 4, pages 1276–310. Jerusalem: Lambda Publishers, 2003.
Jacob ben Asher (Baal Ha-Turim). Commentary on the Torah. Early 14th century. In, e.g., Baal Haturim Chumash: Shemos/Exodus. Translated by Eliyahu Touger; edited and annotated by Avie Gold, volume 2, pages 845–79. Brooklyn: Mesorah Publications, 2000.
Isaac ben Moses Arama. Akedat Yizhak (The Binding of Isaac). Late 15th century. In, e.g., Yitzchak Arama. Akeydat Yitzchak: Commentary of Rabbi Yitzchak Arama on the Torah. Translated and condensed by Eliyahu Munk, volume 1, pages 471–83. New York, Lambda Publishers, 2001.

Modern
Isaac Abravanel. Commentary on the Torah. Italy, between 1492 and 1509. In, e.g., Abarbanel: Selected Commentaries on the Torah: Volume 2: Shemos/Exodus. Translated and annotated by Israel Lazar, pages 329–68. Brooklyn: CreateSpace, 2015.
Abraham Saba. Ẓeror ha-Mor (Bundle of Myrrh). Fez, Morocco, circa 1500. In, e.g., Tzror Hamor: Torah Commentary by Rabbi Avraham Sabba. Translated and annotated by Eliyahu Munk, volume 3, pages 1123–46. Jerusalem, Lambda Publishers, 2008.
Obadiah ben Jacob Sforno. Commentary on the Torah. Venice, 1567. In, e.g., Sforno: Commentary on the Torah. Translation and explanatory notes by Raphael Pelcovitz, pages 432–43. Brooklyn: Mesorah Publications, 1997.
Moshe Alshich. Commentary on the Torah. Safed, circa 1593. In, e.g., Moshe Alshich. Midrash of Rabbi Moshe Alshich on the Torah. Translated and annotated by Eliyahu Munk, volume 2, pages 551–62. New York, Lambda Publishers, 2000.
Shlomo Ephraim Luntschitz. Kli Yakar. Lublin, 1602. In, e.g., Kli Yakar: Shemos. Translated by Elihu Levine, volume 2, pages 225–72. Southfield, Michigan: Targum Press/Feldheim Publishers, 2007.

Avraham Yehoshua Heschel. Commentaries on the Torah. Cracow, Poland, mid 17th century. Compiled as Chanukat HaTorah. Edited by Chanoch Henoch Erzohn. Piotrkow, Poland, 1900. In Avraham Yehoshua Heschel. Chanukas HaTorah: Mystical Insights of Rav Avraham Yehoshua Heschel on Chumash. Translated by Avraham Peretz Friedman, pages 189–90. Southfield, Michigan: Targum Press/Feldheim Publishers, 2004.
Thomas Hobbes. Leviathan, 3:34, 40, 42. England, 1651. Reprint edited by C. B. Macpherson, pages 431, 503–04, 572, 585. Harmondsworth, England: Penguin Classics, 1982.

Saul Levi Morteira. “Eulogy for David Masiah.” Budapest, 1652. “Guarded Him as the Pupil of His Eye.” Amsterdam, 1645. In Marc Saperstein. Exile in Amsterdam: Saul Levi Morteira’s Sermons to a Congregation of “New Jews,” pages 527–35. Cincinnati: Hebrew Union College Press, 2005.
Edward Taylor. "18. Meditation. Heb. 13.10. Wee Have an Altar." In Preliminary Meditations: First Series. Cambridge, Massachusetts: Early 18th Century. In Harold Bloom. American Religious Poems, 21–22. New York: Library of America, 2006.
Chaim ibn Attar. Ohr ha-Chaim. Venice, 1742. In Chayim ben Attar. Or Hachayim: Commentary on the Torah. Translated by Eliyahu Munk, volume 2, pages 788–814. Brooklyn: Lambda Publishers, 1999.

Yaakov Culi and Yitzchak Magriso. Me'am Lo'ez. Constantinople, 1746. In Jacob Culi and Yitzchak Magriso. The Torah Anthology: Me'am Lo'ez. Translated by Aryeh Kaplan, volume 9, pages 141–265. Jerusalem: Moznaim Publishing, 1990.
Nachman of Breslov. Teachings. Bratslav, Ukraine, before 1811. In Rebbe Nachman's Torah: Breslov Insights into the Weekly Torah Reading: Exodus-Leviticus. Compiled by Chaim Kramer; edited by Y. Hall, pages 223–31. Jerusalem: Breslov Research Institute, 2011.
Samson Raphael Hirsch. The Pentateuch: Exodus. Translated by Isaac Levy, volume 2, pages 509–75. Gateshead: Judaica Press, 2nd edition 1999. Originally published as Der Pentateuch uebersetzt und erklaert. Frankfurt, 1867–1878.

Samuel David Luzzatto (Shadal). Commentary on the Torah. Padua, 1871. In, e.g., Samuel David Luzzatto. Torah Commentary. Translated and annotated by Eliyahu Munk, volume 3, pages 858–66. New York: Lambda Publishers, 2012.
Yehudah Aryeh Leib Alter. Sefat Emet. Góra Kalwaria (Ger), Poland, before 1906. Excerpted in The Language of Truth: The Torah Commentary of Sefat Emet. Translated and interpreted by Arthur Green, pages 123–27. Philadelphia: Jewish Publication Society, 1998. Reprinted 2012.
Alexander Alan Steinbach. Sabbath Queen: Fifty-four Bible Talks to the Young Based on Each Portion of the Pentateuch, pages 61–64. New York: Behrman's Jewish Book House, 1936.
Benno Jacob. The Second Book of the Bible: Exodus. London, 1940. Translated by Walter Jacob, pages 809–28. Hoboken, New Jersey: Ktav Publishing House, 1992.

Thomas Mann. Joseph and His Brothers. Translated by John E. Woods, 382. New York: Alfred A. Knopf, 2005. Originally published as Joseph und seine Brüder. Stockholm: Bermann-Fischer Verlag, 1943.
Isaac Mendelsohn. "Urim and Thummim." In The Interpreter's Dictionary of the Bible, volume 4, pages 739–40. Nashville, Tennessee: Abingdon Press, 1962.
Umberto Cassuto. A Commentary on the Book of Exodus. Jerusalem, 1951. Translated by Israel Abrahams, pages 369–92. Jerusalem: The Magnes Press, The Hebrew University, 1967.

Moshe Greenberg. "Urim and Thummim." In Encyclopaedia Judaica, volume 16, pages 8–9. Jerusalem: Keter Publishing House, 1972.
Carol L. Meyers. The Tabernacle Menorah. Missoula, Montana: Scholars Press, 1976.
Elie Munk. The Call of the Torah: An Anthology of Interpretation and Commentary on the Five Books of Moses. Translated by E.S. Mazer, volume 2, pages 392–425. Brooklyn: Mesorah Publications, 1995. Originally published as La Voix de la Thora. Paris: Fondation Samuel et Odette Levy, 1981.
Victor (Avigdor) Hurowitz. “The Priestly Account of Building the Tabernacle.” Journal of the American Oriental Society, volume 105 (number 1) (January–March 1985): pages 21–30.
Ranon Katzoff. “Suffragium in Exodus Rabbah 37.2.” Classical Philology, volume 81 (number 3) (July 1986): pages 235–40.
Pinchas H. Peli. Torah Today: A Renewed Encounter with Scripture, pages 85–89. Washington, D.C.: B'nai B'rith Books, 1987.
Nahman Avigad. “The Inscribed Pomegranate from the ‘House of the Lord.’” Biblical Archaeologist, volume 53 (number 3) (September 1990): pages 157–66.
Mark S. Smith. The Early History of God: Yahweh and the Other Deities in Ancient Israel, pages 10. New York: HarperSanFrancisco, 1990..
Harvey J. Fields. A Torah Commentary for Our Times: Volume II: Exodus and Leviticus, pages 69–76. New York: UAHC Press, 1991.
Nahum M. Sarna. The JPS Torah Commentary: Exodus: The Traditional Hebrew Text with the New JPS Translation, pages 175–95. Philadelphia: Jewish Publication Society, 1991.
Nehama Leibowitz. New Studies in Shemot (Exodus), volume 2, pages 508–34. Jerusalem: Haomanim Press, 1993. Reprinted as New Studies in the Weekly Parasha. Lambda Publishers, 2010.
Walter Brueggemann. “The Book of Exodus.” In The New Interpreter's Bible. Edited by Leander E. Keck, volume 1, pages 902–17. Nashville: Abingdon Press, 1994.
Judith S. Antonelli. "The Tabernacle." In In the Image of God: A Feminist Commentary on the Torah, pages 203–12. Northvale, New Jersey: Jason Aronson, 1995.
Ellen Frankel. The Five Books of Miriam: A Woman’s Commentary on the Torah, pages 133–35. New York: G. P. Putnam's Sons, 1996.
W. Gunther Plaut. The Haftarah Commentary, pages 195–202. New York: UAHC Press, 1996.
Sorel Goldberg Loeb and Barbara Binder Kadden. Teaching Torah: A Treasury of Insights and Activities, pages 134–39. Denver: A.R.E. Publishing, 1997.
Cornelis Van Dam. The Urim and Thummin: A Means of Revelation in Ancient Israel. Winona Lake, Indiana: Eisenbrauns, 1997.

Adin Steinsaltz. Simple Words: Thinking About What Really Matters in Life, 156. New York: Simon & Schuster, 1999.
Exodus to Deuteronomy: A Feminist Companion to the Bible (Second Series). Edited by Athalya Brenner, pages 34, 38. Sheffield: Sheffield Academic Press, 2000.
Sara Paasche-Orlow. "Finding Our Home in the Temple and the Temple in Our Homes." In The Women's Torah Commentary: New Insights from Women Rabbis on the 54 Weekly Torah Portions. Edited by Elyse Goldstein, pages 160–63. Woodstock, Vermont: Jewish Lights Publishing, 2000.
Martin R. Hauge. The Descent from the Mountain: Narrative Patterns in Exodus 19–40. Sheffield: Journal for the Study of the Old Testament Press, 2001.
Avivah Gottlieb Zornberg. The Particulars of Rapture: Reflections on Exodus, pages 351–97. New York: Doubleday, 2001.
Lainie Blum Cogan and Judy Weiss. Teaching Haftarah: Background, Insights, and Strategies, pages 481–88. Denver: A.R.E. Publishing, 2002.
Michael Fishbane. The JPS Bible Commentary: Haftarot, pages 123–28. Philadelphia: Jewish Publication Society, 2002.
Alan Lew. This Is Real and You Are Completely Unprepared: The Days of Awe as a Journey of Transformation, 53–55. Boston: Little, Brown and Co., 2003.
Robert Alter. The Five Books of Moses: A Translation with Commentary, pages 471–86. New York: W.W. Norton & Co., 2004.
Jeffrey H. Tigay. "Exodus." In The Jewish Study Bible. Edited by Adele Berlin and Marc Zvi Brettler, pages 171–79. New York: Oxford University Press, 2004.
Professors on the Parashah: Studies on the Weekly Torah Reading Edited by Leib Moscovitz, pages 142–44. Jerusalem: Urim Publications, 2005.
W. Gunther Plaut. The Torah: A Modern Commentary: Revised Edition. Revised edition edited by David E.S. Stern, pages 561–79. New York: Union for Reform Judaism, 2006.
William H.C. Propp. Exodus 19–40, 2A:310–538. New York: Anchor Bible, 2006.

Suzanne A. Brody. "Aaron's Adornments." In Dancing in the White Spaces: The Yearly Torah Cycle and More Poems, 82. Shelbyville, Kentucky: Wasteland Press, 2007.
James L. Kugel. How To Read the Bible: A Guide to Scripture, Then and Now, pages 358. New York: Free Press, 2007.
Kenton L. Sparks. “‘Enūma Elish’ and Priestly Mimesis: Elite Emulation in Nascent Judaism.” Journal of Biblical Literature, volume 126 (2007): 637–42. (“Priestly Mimesis in the Tabernacle Narrative (Exodus 25–40)”).
The Mishkan: The Tabernacle: Its Structure, Its Vessels, and the Kohen's Vestments. Brooklyn: Artscroll, 2008.
The Torah: A Women's Commentary. Edited by Tamara Cohn Eskenazi and Andrea L. Weiss, pages 473–94. New York: Women of Reform Judaism/URJ Press, 2008.
Marla Brettschneider. “When the Fabulous Is Holy: Parashat Tetzaveh (Exodus 27:20–30:10).” In Torah Queeries: Weekly Commentaries on the Hebrew Bible. Edited by Gregg Drinkwater, Joshua Lesser, and David Shneer; foreword by Judith Plaskow, pages 106–08. New York: New York University Press, 2009.
Thomas B. Dozeman. Commentary on Exodus, pages 633–63. Grand Rapids, Michigan: William B. Eerdmans Publishing Company, 2009.
Reuven Hammer. Entering Torah: Prefaces to the Weekly Torah Portion, pages 119–24. New York: Gefen Publishing House, 2009.
Rebecca G.S. Idestrom. “Echoes of the Book of Exodus in Ezekiel.” Journal for the Study of the Old Testament, volume 33 (number 4) (June 2009): pages 489–510. (Motifs from Exodus found in Ezekiel, including the call narrative, divine encounters, captivity, signs, plagues, judgment, redemption, tabernacle/temple, are considered.).

Bruce Wells. "Exodus." In Zondervan Illustrated Bible Backgrounds Commentary. Edited by John H. Walton, volume 1, pages 253–57. Grand Rapids, Michigan: Zondervan, 2009.
Jonathan Sacks. Covenant & Conversation: A Weekly Reading of the Jewish Bible: Exodus: The Book of Redemption, pages 217–48. Jerusalem: Maggid Books, 2010.
Avrohom Biderman. The Mishkan: The Tabernacle: Its Structure and its Sacred Vessels. Brooklyn: Artscroll, 2011.
James W. Watts. “Aaron and the Golden Calf in the Rhetoric of the Pentateuch.” Journal of Biblical Literature, volume 130 (number 3) (fall 2011): pages 417–30.
William G. Dever. The Lives of Ordinary People in Ancient Israel: When Archaeology and the Bible Intersect, pages 244. Grand Rapids, Michigan: William B. Eerdmans Publishing Company, 2012.

Shmuel Herzfeld. "hah: The Source of Spirituality." In Fifty-Four Pick Up: Fifteen-Minute Inspirational Torah Lessons, pages 117–22. Jerusalem: Gefen Publishing House, 2012.
Torah MiEtzion: New Readings in Tanach: Shemot. Edited by Ezra Bick and Yaakov Beasley, pages 377–410. Jerusalem: Maggid Books, 2012.
Michael B. Hundley. Gods in Dwellings: Temples and Divine Presence in the Ancient Near East. Atlanta: Society of Biblical Literature, 2013.
Jonathan Sacks. Lessons in Leadership: A Weekly Reading of the Jewish Bible, pages 99–104. New Milford, Connecticut: Maggid Books, 2015.
Jonathan Sacks. Essays on Ethics: A Weekly Reading of the Jewish Bible, pages 123–29. New Milford, Connecticut: Maggid Books, 2016.
Shai Held. The Heart of Torah, Volume 1: Essays on the Weekly Torah Portion: Genesis and Exodus, pages 194–202. Philadelphia: Jewish Publication Society, 2017.
Steven Levy and Sarah Levy. The JPS Rashi Discussion Torah Commentary, pages 62–64. Philadelphia: Jewish Publication Society, 2017.

External links

Texts
Masoretic text and 1917 JPS translation
Hear the parashah chanted 
Hear the parashah read in Hebrew

Commentaries

Academy for Jewish Religion, California
Academy for Jewish Religion, New York
Aish.com
Akhlah: The Jewish Children's Learning Network
Aleph Beta Academy
American Jewish University—Ziegler School of Rabbinic Studies
Anshe Emes Synagogue, Los Angeles
Ari Goldwag
Ascent of Safed
Bar-Ilan University
Chabad.org
The Desert Tabernacle
eparsha.com
G-dcast
Jewish Agency for Israel
Jewish Theological Seminary
The Israel Koschitzky Virtual Beit Midrash
Kabbala Online
Mechon Hadar
Miriam Aflalo 
MyJewishLearning.com
Ohr Sameach
Orthodox Union
OzTorah, Torah from Australia
Oz Ve Shalom—Netivot Shalom
Pardes from Jerusalem
Patheos
Professor James L. Kugel
Professor Michael Carasik
Rabbi Dov Linzer
Rabbi Fabian Werbin
Rabbi Jonathan Sacks
Rabbi Shimon.com
Rabbi Shlomo Riskin
Rabbi Shmuel Herzfeld
Rabbi Stan Levin
Reconstructionist Judaism 
Sephardic Institute 
Shiur.com
613.org Jewish Torah Audio
Tanach Study Center
Teach613.org, Torah Education at Cherry Hill
TheTorah.com
Torah from Dixie
Torah.org
TorahVort.com
Union for Reform Judaism
United Synagogue of Conservative Judaism
What's Bothering Rashi?
Yeshivat Chovevei Torah
Yeshiva University

Weekly Torah readings in Adar
Weekly Torah readings from Exodus